ISD 279-Osseo Area Schools is a school system in Hennepin County, Minnesota. ISD 279 provides public education from the primary to secondary levels in the following to parts of Brooklyn Center, Brooklyn Park, Maple Grove, Osseo, Plymouth, Corcoran, Dayton and Rogers. District 279 is the fifth largest district in Minnesota, with a student population of approximately 20,900 in 2019.

Overview
Osseo Area Schools serve all or parts of Brooklyn Center, Brooklyn Park, Corcoran, Crystal, Dayton, Hassan Township, Maple Grove, Osseo, and Plymouth. District 279 has 17 elementary schools (Pre-K-5), four middle schools (6-8), three high schools and an area learning center (9-12), and an online school (K-12).

A comprehensive PreK-12 school district, Osseo prepares students for college, post-secondary vocational training and the job market.

Elementary schools focus on reading and math achievement. Students also receive instruction in writing, research, science, social studies, physical education and the arts.  Literacy in technology, media and information retrieval is taught within subject areas.  Many schools offer a variety of programs such as preschool programs, Kidstop (School Aged Child Care), all-day kindergarten, multi-age classrooms and team teaching. Title 1 programs provide academic support to improve reading and math skills through an individualized plan for improvement. ELL (English Language Learning) programs provide services to students who need additional support with english learning to be successful in an educational environment.

The district's magnet school program offers value-added curriculum at three elementary schools: Birch Grove Elementary School for the Arts, Weaver Lake Elementary, a Science, Math, and Technology School, and Zanewood Community school, a Science, Technology, Engineering, Arts, and Math school.  North View Middle school and Park Center Senior High (grade 10) offer students the International Baccalaureate Middle Years Programme (applicant status). Brooklyn Middle School has a Science, Technology, Engineering, Arts, and Math program for their students.

The middle schools offer middle-level programming designed to let students sample elective courses and advance according to aptitude.  Senior highs offer more than 250 basic, advanced, online, and elective courses including calculus, advanced math and science classes.  Each school provides three years of French and Spanish; some offer German.

The district has made an effort to increase technology integration in the classroom. Over 85% of the classrooms have mounted projectors as this was determined to be important classroom equipment. Many classrooms have document cameras and classroom amplification systems to enhance learning.  In additional, there is wireless internet access at all sites, providing a public network for students who bring their own technology devices for educational use (BYOD). To support integration of technology into instruction, staff development is provided through the C4 Model of Learning, which has received the ISTE (International Society for Technology in Education) Seal of Alignment.
In the 2016-2017 school year, all 4th-12th grade students received iPads to integrate technology into the classroom.

Each school provides a wide variety of talented and gifted program services, from enrichment at elementary level to secondary-level advanced classes in English, math, science and social studies.

District 279's highly ranked Special Education program provides services from birth to high school graduation or age 22.  Whenever possible, services are provided in regular classroom settings with children of the same age.

Schools
Here is a complete list of schools in the Osseo Area School District 279 (from primary level to Secondary level, including magnet schools to educational learning and early childhood centers:

Early Childhood Centers
Arbor View Early Childhood Center
Willow Lane Early Childhood Center

Elementary schools
Basswood Elementary School 
Birch Grove Elementary School for the Arts
Cedar Island Elementary School (1970)
Crest View Elementary School
Edinbrook Elementary School 
Elm Creek Elementary School
Fair Oaks Elementary School 
Fernbrook Elementary School 
Garden City Elementary School 
Oak View Elementary School         
Palmer Lake Elementary School
Park Brook Elementary School  
Rice Lake Elementary School    
Rush Creek Elementary School
Weaver Lake Elementary School: A Science, Math and Technology School     
Woodland Elementary School     
Zanewood Community School

Middle schools
Brooklyn Middle School  
Maple Grove Middle School
North View Middle School
Osseo Middle School

Senior high schools
Osseo Senior High School       
Park Center Senior High School
Maple Grove Senior High School

Educational Learning Centers
Osseo Area Learning Center
Osseo Education Center
Osseo Enrollment Center
Adult Basic Education Services at Northwest Family Service Center
279Online K-12 School
Educational Service Center

Leadership 
The Independent School District 279 School Board describes itself as having "the duty of the care, management, and control of the public schools of the school district in accordance with the authority granted them in law." See Board of education for further details on the functions of a school board. The Minneapolis Board of Education has been granted the power to carry out such duties by the State of Minnesota and the Minnesota Legislature.

Current members
Chair: Kelsey Dawson Walton
Vice Chair: Jackie Mosqueda-Jones
Treasurer: Tanya Simons 
Clerk: Heather Douglass
Director: Thomas Brooks
Director: Tamara Grady

Resignation of Robert Gerhart
Robert Gerhart, chairman of the school board, resigned after numerous citizens took screen shots of his public posts and comments on social media featuring racist and bigoted themes, and demanded his removal. The majority of posts and comments by Gerhart had been made months and years prior. They were discovered after Gerhart proposed, in a school board meeting, that the district could engage armed volunteers  to patrol district schools. He'd had the idea, Gerhart said, for "years," but hadn't proposed it until then after, the Stoneman Douglas High School shooting, another of many mass school shootings across the country. Gerhart resigned a week and a half later after numerous parents, residents and groups contacted the district with evidence and complaints.

External links
Osseo Area School District 279

Early Childhood Centers
Early Childhood Family Education at Arbor View and Willow Lane
Early Childhood Special Education at Arbor View and Willow Lane

Elementary schools
Basswood Elementary School
Birch Grove Elementary School for the Arts
Cedar Island Elementary School 
Crest View Elementary School
Edinbrook Elementary School 
Elm Creek Elementary School
Fair Oaks Elementary School 
Fernbrook Elementary School 
Garden City Elementary School 
Oak View Elementary School         
Palmer Lake Elementary School
Park Brook Elementary School  
Rice Lake Elementary School    
Rush Creek Elementary School
Weaver Lake Elementary: A Science, Math and Technology School     
Woodland Elementary School     
Zanewood Community School

Middle schools
Brooklyn Middle School  
Maple Grove Middle School 
North View Middle School
Osseo Middle School

Senior high schools
Osseo Senior High School       
Park Center Senior High School 
Maple Grove Senior High School

Educational Learning Centers
Osseo Area Learning Center
Osseo Education Center
Osseo Enrollment Center
Adult Basic Education Services at Northwest Family Service Center
279Online K-12 School
Educational Service Center

See also
List of school districts in Minnesota

References

External links
 

School districts in Minnesota
Suburban Minneapolis School Districts
Education in Hennepin County, Minnesota